Voices Carry is the first studio album by American new wave band 'Til Tuesday, released in 1985.

'Til Tuesday's debut single was the album's title track, which went to #8 on the Billboard singles chart and remains the band's best-known song. The "Voices Carry" video won the MTV Video Music Award for Best New Artist and was played heavily on MTV. It depicts a boyfriend trying to convert Aimee Mann to his upper-class lifestyle; she finally lashes out at him during a concert at Carnegie Hall, standing up from her seat in the audience and belting the lyrics ("He said, shut up! He said, shut up! Oh God, can't you keep it down?...") as she removes her cap to reveal her signature spiky, rat-tailed hair, while her boyfriend hides his face in embarrassment and the rest of the attendees look on in shock.

Except for one short establishing shot of the exterior of New York City's Carnegie Hall, the video was shot completely on-location in Boston, MA.  The Strand Theater in Dorchester's Upham's Corner doubled for the interior of Carnegie Hall during the video's final crane shot.

The album's second and third singles were "Looking Over My Shoulder" (which peaked at No. 61 on the Billboard Hot 100) and "Love in a Vacuum".

Production
Martin Rushent was being considered for the role of producer for Voices Carry.

Release
Voices Carry was released on April 20, 1985. The album entered the Billboard 200 at 152nd place on June 25. The album spent 31 weeks on the chart peaking at 23.

Reception

From contemporary reviews, Spin described the album as "a pleasure, but not a revelation." and that "almost all the tunes are instantly catchy, if not especially inspired."
Spin praised the group's vocalist stating that "in lead singer Aimee Mann they may have a star. [...] she has her own look and a voice that's evocative, thought not yet distinctive enough to stake out its own turf in the crowded field of female vocalists." Robert Christgau gave the album a B− rating, stating that the group rolls out "synth-pop hooks like vintage A Flock of Seagulls, but Aimee Mann's throaty warble sounds almost human. And while the generalization level of her aggressively banal lyrics signals product, not expression, every one lands square on a recognizable romantic cliché."

From retrospective reviews, AllMusic wrote that "While most bands from Boston suffered from lack of production, Mike Thorne does a decent job on much of the album and excellent work on the title track." The review found that "Love in a Vacuum" was "over-produced, creating a good album track when the true follow-up hit was actually in hand." The review went on to note haunting lyrics on "I Could Get Used to This" and "No More Crying" which "separate this recording from work of similar '80s bands". The review concluded that "this album and its follow-ups should have had as much commercial success as the Cars, because artistically, they are equal to that band's dynamic debut."

Legacy
The popular Canadian teen drama Degrassi: The Next Generation, which is known for naming each episode after an ‘80s hit song or album, named a two-part episode after this album.

Track listing

Personnel
'Til Tuesday
Aimee Mann – lead vocals, backing vocals and bass
Robert Holmes – electric guitar and backing vocals
Joey Pesce – synthesizers, piano and backing vocals
Michael Hausman – drums, percussion

Production
Produced By Mike Thorne
Executive Producer: Dick Wingate
Engineered By Dominick Maita
Mixed By Harvey Goldberg; assisted by Moira Marquis
Studio Assistants: Mike Krowiak & Jeff Lippay
Mastered By Jack Skinner
Britain Hill - photography

Charts

Certifications

Notes

References
 

'Til Tuesday albums
1985 debut albums
Epic Records albums
Albums produced by Mike Thorne